Arthur W. Bates (1883 – August 16, 1972) was an American silent film actor.

He was born in 1883 in Chicago, Illinois. He was acting with Essanay Studios in Chicago by 1915. After the studio closed down, he worked for the Chicago Transit Authority.

Bates died in Chicago on August 16, 1972.

Partial filmography
His New Job (1915)
The Alster Case (1915)
The Strange Case of Mary Page (1916)
 The Phantom Buccaneer (1916)
Uneasy Money (1918)

References

External links

1883 births
1972 deaths
American male silent film actors
20th-century American male actors
Male actors from Chicago